Sören Grahn (born 26 December 1962) is a Swedish curler and curling coach.

He participated in the demonstration curling events at the 1988 Winter Olympics and 1992 Winter Olympics, where the Swedish team finished in fifth place both times.

Personal life
Grahn has two children. He currently lives in Beijing.

Teams

Record as a coach of national teams

References

External links

Living people
1962 births
Sportspeople from Karlstad
Swedish male curlers
Curlers at the 1988 Winter Olympics
Curlers at the 1992 Winter Olympics
Olympic curlers of Sweden
Swedish curling coaches
Swedish expatriate sportspeople in China
Sportspeople from Beijing